"Stay Awake" is a song from Walt Disney's 1964 film Mary Poppins composed by Richard M. Sherman and Robert B. Sherman.

It is a lullaby sung by Mary Poppins (Julie Andrews) to the children Jane and Michael. The children protest when Mary tells them it's time for bed, but when "Stay Awake" is sung, the children yawn and doze off to sleep.

The song has been recorded by several artists, including:
Duke Ellington
Collin Raye
Harry Connick Jr
Louis Prima
Suzanne Vega
The Innocence Mission
Celtic Woman
 Brian Wilson covered it on his album In the Key of Disney, which was released on October 25, 2011.
 Hayley Westenra

It is not featured in the 2004 stage musical adaptation.

See also 
From the next night: Feed the Birds

References

External links
Audio clip, Julie Andrews singing "Stay Awake" at reelclassics.com

Songs about sleep
1964 songs
Songs from Mary Poppins
Songs written by the Sherman Brothers
Julie Andrews songs
Lullabies